HMS Byron was a US-built Captain class frigate of the Royal Navy during World War II. Named after Vice Admiral The Honourable John Byron whose frequent encounters with bad weather in ensuing years won him the sobriquet, "Foul Weather Jack".
Originally laid down as DE-79, a turbo-electric (TE) type Buckley-class destroyer escort, she was diverted to the Royal Navy and named HMS Byron before the launch.

Actions
During World War II, HMS Byron earned battle honours for service in the English Channel, the Arctic, and the Atlantic in 1944 and in the North Sea in 1944 and 1945.

General information
Pennant (UK): K 508
Hull number (US): DE 79
Built by: Bethlehem-Hingham Shipyard Inc. (Hingham, Massachusetts, U.S.A.)

Notes

External links
 Uboat.net page for HMS Byron
 Uboat.net page for U-722
 Uboat.net page for U-1001
 captainclassfrigates.co.uk

References
 The Captain Class Frigates in the Second World War by Donald Collingwood. published by Leo Cooper (1998), .
 The Buckley-Class Destroyer Escorts by Bruce Hampton Franklin, published by Chatham Publishing (1999), .
 German U-Boat Losses During World War II by Axel Niestle, published by United States Naval Inst (1998), .

Captain-class frigates
Buckley-class destroyer escorts
World War II frigates of the United Kingdom
Ships built in Hingham, Massachusetts
1943 ships